Ketur is a village in the Karmala taluka of Solapur district in Maharashtra state, India.

Demographics
Covering  and comprising 820 households at the time of the 2011 census of India, Ketur had a population of 3920. There were 2046 males and 1874 females, with 452 people being aged six or younger.

References

Villages in Karmala taluka